"In Demand" is a song by Scottish band Texas, written by Dallas Austin with band members Johnny McElhone and Sharleen Spiteri. The song was released in Europe on 25 September 2000 and in the United Kingdom on 2 October 2000 as the first single from their compilation album The Greatest Hits, reaching number six on the UK Singles Chart and number 10 in Spain.

Music video
The single was accompanied by a music video, which stars English actor Alan Rickman alongside Sharleen Spiteri. In it, Spiteri is seen wrapped up in a parka jacket being driven through the night in the back of a chauffeured Bentley Azure. A suited Rickman strokes and comforts her while helicopters and motorbikes photograph them. When the car pulls in for petrol, Rickman pulls off Spiteri's parka jacket to reveal an evening dress underneath and they dance a tango together on the station forecourt. The Petrol forecourt scene was filmed at the Shell petrol station in Bordon, Hampshire.

In the early morning, the car drives them into the seaside town Brighton and parks up outside a run-down apartment block called Embassy Court on the Kings Road where Rickman hauls a shabby backpack out of the boot and enters the building, Spiteri is driven away by her chauffeur.

Track listings

UK and European CD1 (MERCD 528)
 "In Demand"
 "Early Hours"
 "Like Lovers (Holding On)"
 "In Demand" (video)

UK and European CD2 (MERDD 528)
 "In Demand" (US mix)
 "In Demand" (Sunship Remix)
 "In Demand" (Wookie Remix)
 "In Demand" (Sunship Dub)

UK cassette single (MERMC 528)
A. "In Demand"
B. "In Demand" (Sunship Remix)

European enhanced CD single (562 981-2)
 "In Demand"
 "Like Lovers (Holding On)"
 "In Demand" (Sunship Remix)
 "In Demand" (Wookie Remix)
 "In Demand" (video)

Personnel
Personnel are lifted from The Greatest Hits album booklet.

 Dallas Austin – writing, keyboards, production
 Johnny McElhone – writing, keyboards, programming
 Sharleen Spiteri – writing, backing vocals, programming
 Debra Killings – backing vocals
 Tomi Martin – guitars
 Eddie Campbell – keyboards, programming
 Tom Knight – drums
 Kenny Macdonald – additional drums
 Rick Sheppard – programming
 Mark "Spike" Stent – mixing

Charts

Weekly charts

Year-end charts

Release history

References

2000 singles
2000 songs
Mercury Records singles
Music videos directed by Vaughan Arnell
Songs written by Dallas Austin
Songs written by Johnny McElhone
Songs written by Sharleen Spiteri
Texas (band) songs